Avatar is a 2004 English-language Singaporean science fiction action film directed by Kuo Jian Hong and written by Christopher Hatton.

Plot
In 2019, nearly everyone is identified by an implanted microchip and connected to the cybernet. Criminals use fake chips, known as "SIMs" (Simulated Identity iMplants). Bounty hunter Dash MacKenzie is looking for a man who bought a SIM, and uncovers a game played by corporation heads to manipulate society.

Cast
 Genevieve O'Reilly as Dash MacKenzie
 Joan Chen as Madame Ong
 David Warner as Joseph Lau
 Wang Luoyong as Officer Victor Huang
 William Sanderson as Riley
 Lim Kay Siu as Julius
 Kumar as Zai
 Richard Low as Uncle Ban
 Michael de Mesa as Davinder Sandhu
 Gerald Chew as Edward Chan
 T. Sasitharan as Minister
 Robin Atkin Downes
 Kate Wilson as Lt. Crowley

Production
Avatar was the first English-language film produced in Singapore. Filming took place in Singapore from April to May 2001 with the working title Avatar Exile.

Release
The film was first released on Russian television on 15 September 2004 before seeing a theatrical release in Singapore on 7 March 2005. Under the title Matrix Hunter, Pand Co. Ltd. issued a DVD on 7 June 2005 and, as Cyber Wars, New Line Home Entertainment released the film on region 1 DVD on 11 April 2006.

Reception
The film received generally negative reviews. Cheah Ui-Hoon of The Business Times rated the film C-. Ong Sor Fern of The Straits Times gave the film a negative review.

References

External links
 Review at Beyondhollywood.com via Archive.org
 
 
 

2004 films
Films set in the future
Films set in 2019
Films shot in Singapore
Singaporean science fiction films
Cyberpunk films
Holography in films
2004 science fiction action films
Films about telepresence
2000s English-language films